Menemerus magnificus is a jumping spider species in the genus Menemerus that lives in Cameroon. The male was described by Wanda Wesołowska in 1999.

References

Endemic fauna of Cameroon
Salticidae
Spiders of Africa
Arthropods of Cameroon
Spiders described in 1999
Taxa named by Wanda Wesołowska